Philip John Ford (né Feeney; October 16, 1900 – January 12, 1976) was an American film director and actor. He directed more than 40 films between 1945 and 1964. He also appeared 16 in films between 1916 and 1926. He was the son of actor/director Francis Ford and the nephew of director John Ford.  He was born with the family name Feeney in Portland, Maine, and only later took on the family name of "Ford" after his father and uncle had.  He died in Los Angeles, California.

Selected filmography
 The Mystery Ship (1917)
 The Silent Mystery (1918)
 The Mystery of 13 (1919)
 The Great Reward (1921)
 According to Hoyle (1922)
 Thundering Hoofs (1922)
 Perils of the Wild (1925)
 Officer 444 (1926)
 The Blue Eagle (1926)
 Crime of the Century (1946)
 The Mysterious Mr. Valentine (1946)
 The Inner Circle (1946)
 The Last Crooked Mile (1946)
 The Invisible Informer (1946)
 Train to Alcatraz (1948)
 Pride of Maryland (1951)
 The Dakota Kid (1951)

References

External links

1900 births
1976 deaths
20th-century American male actors
Film directors from Maine
American male film actors
American male silent film actors
Male actors from Portland, Maine
Deaths from cancer in California